Bakers Delight is an Australian-owned multinational bakery franchise chain, with franchisors in Australia, New Zealand, Canada and the United States.

There are 20 stores in New Zealand, including 13 in Auckland alone.

History
Bakers Delight was established in May 1980 by husband and wife team, Roger and Lesley Gillespie. Roger, a third-generation baker, opened a single bakery on Glenferrie Road in Hawthorn, Victoria.  

Bakers Delight operates over 700 bakeries globally. In 2000, the franchise had 12 stores in New Zealand and was planning further expansion.

Bakers Delight entered the Canadian market in 2003, under the name COBS Bread, and now has over 130 bakeries in 5 provinces.

References

External links
Bakers Delight Australian website
Bakers Delight New Zealand website
COBS Bread Canada/USA website

Restaurant franchises
Retail companies of Australia
Coffeehouses and cafés in Australia
Retail companies established in 1980
Food and drink companies established in 1980
Bakery cafés
Food manufacturers of Australia
Bakeries of Australia
Retail companies of Canada
1980 establishments in Australia
Companies based in Melbourne